Ehmaniella is a genus of trilobite known from the Middle Cambrian Burgess Shale. 392 specimens of Ehmaniella are known from the Greater Phyllopod bed, where they comprise 0.74% of the community.

Ehmaniella's major characteristics are a wide cranidium, heavy eye ridges, longitudinal striae on the pre-glabellar area, and a small pygidium with few segments.

References

External links 
 

Burgess Shale fossils
Alokistocaridae
Cambrian trilobites
Cambrian genus extinctions